Michael Kenneth Williams was an American actor known for his roles in film and television and theatre. 

He is most known for his performances as Omar Little on the HBO drama series The Wire from 2002 to 2008 and Albert "Chalky" White on the HBO series Boardwalk Empire from 2010 to 2014. He earned Primetime Emmy Award nominations for his performances in the HBO television biopic Bessie (2015), the Netflix drama series When They See Us (2019), and the HBO projects The Night Of (2016) and Lovecraft Country (2020). He has a recurring role in the sitcom Community from 2011 to 2012. He is also known for his supporting roles in a number of films including Ben Affleck's Gone Baby Gone (2006), John Hillcoat's The Road (2009), Steve McQueen's period drama 12 Years a Slave (2013), Paul Thomas Anderson's drama Inherent Vice (2014), and Edward Norton's Motherless Brooklyn (2019). 

Williams received four Screen Actors Guild Award nominations for 12 Years a Slave (2013), Boardwalk Empire (2014, 2015), and Lovecraft Country (2021). He also received a Critics' Choice Television Award for Best Supporting Actor in a Drama Series for his performance Lovecraft Country. He also received the Independent Spirit Robert Altman Award along with the ensemble cast of Inherent Vice (2014).

Major associations

Emmy Awards

Screen Actors Guild Awards

Critics Choice Awards

Gotham Awards

Independent Spirit Awards

Miscellaneous awards

Black Reel Awards

NAACP Image Award

Satellite Award

References 

Williams, Michael K.